Aquib Nabi (born 4 November 1996) is an Indian cricketer. He made his List A debut for Jammu & Kashmir in the 2018–19 Vijay Hazare Trophy on 23 September 2018. He made his Twenty20 debut on 11 November 2019, for Jammu & Kashmir in the 2019–20 Syed Mushtaq Ali Trophy. He made his first-class debut on 3 January 2020, for Jammu & Kashmir in the 2019–20 Ranji Trophy.

References

External links
 

1996 births
Living people
Indian cricketers
Jammu and Kashmir cricketers
Place of birth missing (living people)